Kisfaludy is a Hungarian surname. Notable people with the surname include:

Anett Kisfaludy (born 1990), Hungarian handballer
Atala Kisfaludy (1836–1911), Hungarian poet and writer
Károly Kisfaludy (1788–1830), Hungarian dramatist and artist, brother of Sándor Kisfaludy
Kisfaludy Society, a literary society in Pest, founded in 1836 and named after Károly Kisfaludy
Lajos Kisfaludy (1924–1988), Hungarian chemical engineer
Sándor Kisfaludy (1772–1844), Hungarian lyric poet

Hungarian-language surnames